Bijay Subba (born December 27, 1957) is a Nepali politician and a member of the House of Representatives of the federal parliament of Nepal. He is the older brother of Deputy House Speaker Shiva Maya Tumbahamphe, and has a PhD in political science from Tribhuwan University. He was a long time member of CPN UML, the party he "deserted" to join Sanghiya Samajwadi Party but returned soon after, and was again appointed to the party's central committee in 2015. He also chaired the subcommittee for Citizenship Bill development formed under the State Affairs and Good Governance Committee of parliament in 2019. He was elected to the parliament in 2017 from CPN UML under the proportional representation system.

References

Living people
Nepal MPs 2017–2022
Nepal MPs 1991–1994
Nepal MPs 1999–2002
Communist Party of Nepal (Unified Marxist–Leninist) politicians
1957 births